The Rose & the Dagger is a 2016 young adult novel by Renée Ahdieh, a sequel of The Wrath & the Dawn, that continues the story of Shahrzad and Khalid.

Reception
The Horn Book Magazine, in a guide review of The Rose & the Dagger, wrote: "Despite more focus on war than on the romance, this conclusion to Ahdieh's The Wrath & the Dawn will satisfy fans." and the School Library Journal wrote "Beautiful, lyrical writing combines with a cohesive plot, richly drawn backdrop, and just the right mix of action and romance to create an undeniable new classic."

The Rose & the Dagger has also been reviewed by Kirkus Reviews, Booklist, Voice of Youth Advocates, Common Sense Media, and Romantic Times.

References

2016 American novels
American young adult novels
Novels based on fairy tales
2016 fantasy novels
Young adult fantasy novels
G. P. Putnam's Sons books